Sydney Ernest Scales  (17 July 1916 – 7 March 2003) was a New Zealand cartoonist.

Biography
Born in Ashburton, New Zealand, Scales studied at the London Central School of Art and Design and was staff cartoonist at the Otago Daily Times from 1951 until his retirement in 1981.

Before his time in London he served in World War II as a flying boat pilot (Catalina) in the Far East. Scales was commissioned in the Royal New Zealand Air Force as a flight lieutenant and then seconded to the Royal Air Force. He saw service in Singapore and, when Singapore was overrun by the Japanese, he flew to Java to continue fighting from there.  When Java was also occupied he was held as a prisoner of war (POW) by the Japanese on Java for three and a half years until being liberated at the end of the war. While in camp Scales showed his talent as a caricaturist by contributing to an in-camp newspaper called Mark Time. Some of these 'Campicatures' were buried and saved by returning POWs at the end of the war and found their way to the Imperial War Museum in London. While being held as a POW, Scales also found the time to escape from prison camp and, along with some fellow-escapees, designed and began building a boat with the intention of sailing to Australia. The Japanese waited until the band of men were low with dysentery before coming to pick them up and take them back to prison camp.

Scales was appointed an Officer of the Order of the British Empire in the 1983 New Year Honours, for service as a cartoonist. He died in Motueka in 2003.

References

Further reading
"A Little Laugh Goes a Long Way" Exhibition of Sid Scales cartoons at the Hocken Collections, with biography
Grant, Ian F. (1980) The unauthorised version: A cartoon history of New Zealand. Auckland:Cassell.

1916 births
2003 deaths
New Zealand cartoonists
New Zealand military personnel of World War II
World War II prisoners of war held by Japan
Royal New Zealand Air Force personnel
Alumni of the Central School of Art and Design
People from Ashburton, New Zealand
New Zealand Officers of the Order of the British Empire